Dylan Thomas (1914-1953) was a Welsh poet.

Dylan Thomas may also refer to:

 Dylan Thomas (Australian musician) (born 1988) Australian musician
 Dylan Thomas (horse) (born 2003)
 Dylan Thomas (field hockey) (born 1996), New Zealand field hockey player
 Dylan Thomas (film), a 1962 short film
 Jon Schillaci (born 1971), former US fugitive who used the alias Dylan Thomas

See also
 Dillon Thomas, American baseball player
 Dylan Thomas Boathouse, a boathouse in Laugharne, Wales
 Dylan Thomas Centre, an arts centre in Swansea, Wales
 Dylan Thomas Prize, a literary prize
 Dylan Thomas Sprouse (born 1992), American actor
 Dylan Thomas Theatre, a theatre in Swansea, Wales